Louis Alfred Holland, Sr. (December 13, 1941 – February 16, 2016) was a Canadian football player who played for the BC Lions. He won the Grey Cup with them in 1964. He played college football previously with the University of Wisconsin. After his football career he was an investment management executive. In 2011, he was inducted into the University of Wisconsin Athletics Hall of Fame. Holland was diagnosed with Alzheimer's disease in 2010 and lived in a nursing home in Oak Park, Illinois. He died in 2016 at the age of 74.

References

1941 births
BC Lions players
2016 deaths
Wisconsin Badgers football players
Sportspeople from Kenosha, Wisconsin